Critical Reviews in Biotechnology is an academic journal that publishes comprehensive review articles that organize, evaluate and present the current status of issues in biotechnology.

Core areas 

The journal covers:
 applications of microbes in the biopharmaceutical, biomedical and food industries
 investigations of naturally occurring organisms for use as chemotherapeutic agents
 novel biotechnological applications of foods
 plant and animal matter as alternatives for human-made synthetic materials

The journal  is owned by Taylor and Francis Group   a United Kingdom-based publisher.

Editors 
The co-editors are Inge Russell, who co-founded the journal in 1978, and Graham Stewart   Emeritus Professor in Brewing and Distilling at Heriot-Watt University, Edinburgh, Scotland.

Publication format 

The journal publishes 4 issues per year in simultaneous print and online editions and is available on a subscription basis and as individual articles All back-issues of the journal are available online  on the publisher's website.

Subscribers to the electronic edition of Critical Reviews in Biotechnology receive access to the online archive, as part of their subscription.

References

External links
 journal homepage

Publications established in 1978
Biotechnology journals
English-language journals
Taylor & Francis academic journals
Review journals